Jorge Massa Dustou is a French-Venezuelan businessman who is one of the wealthiest individuals in Venezuela. Massa is the president of Grupo Mistral, a Venezuelan pharmaceutical and manufacturing company.

Early life
Massa's father and relatives moved to Venezuela in 1942 and entered into the pharmaceutical industry. Massa was born in France and spent his childhood in Venezuela.

Education
Massa studied in Switzerland and the United States, receiving a Bachelor of Business Administration from Babson College and Master of Business Administration from Central University of Venezuela.

Career
Massa worked for Grupo Cisneros until 1985, serving as the Vice President of the Industrial Division and Corporate Operations. In 1985, Massa founded Grupo Mistral.

Grupo Mistral
Health
Farmahorro - branches of pharmacies located in Venezuela
Drogería Farvenca - medication and pharmaceutical distributor

Packaging
Proyecto Pet - bottling and packaging
Ampofrasca - ampoule and vial production

Hygiene
Pharsana - hygiene and cosmetic products
Sanifarma - absorbent products such as pantyliners and diapers

Real estate
Jomadus - manages office and commercial properties

Other ventures
Massa was the main investor of technology and election solution company Smartmatic.

Honours and awards

Personal life
Massa lives with his wife, Ana Cisneros de Massa, the sister of Venezuelan billionaire Gustavo Cisneros, and they have three children; Ana Cristina, María Luisa and Fernando José. The two of them live in Millennium, a building in Madrid, Spain, that is home to the country's elite and millionaires.

References

Living people
Cisneros family
Venezuelan businesspeople
1944 births
Babson College alumni
Central University of Venezuela alumni